Stoney Indian Lake is located in Glacier National Park in the U. S. state of Montana. It is northeast of Wahcheechee Mountain and south of Stoney Indian Peaks.

See also
List of lakes in Glacier County, Montana

References

Lakes of Glacier National Park (U.S.)
Lakes of Glacier County, Montana